The Kwasio language, also known as Ngumba / Mvumbo, Bujeba, and Gyele / Kola, is a language of Cameroon, spoken in the south along the coast and at the border with Equatorial Guinea by some 70,000 members of the Ngumba, Kwasio, Gyele and Mabi peoples. Many authors view Kwasio and the Gyele/Kola language as distinct. In the Ethnologue, the languages therefore receive different codes: Kwasio has the ISO 639-3 code nmg, while Gyele has the code gyi. The Kwasio, Ngumba, and Mabi are village farmers; the Gyele (also known as the Kola or Koya) are nomadic Pygmy hunter-gatherers living in the rain forest.

Dialects
Dialects are Kwasio (also known as Kwassio, Bisio), Mvumbo (also known as Ngumba, Ngoumba, Mgoumba, Mekuk), and Mabi (Mabea).

The Gyele speak the subdialects of Mvumbo and Gyele in the north Giele, Gieli, Gyeli, Bagiele, Bagyele (Bagyɛlɛ), Bagielli, Bajele, Bajeli, Bogyel, Bogyeli, Bondjiel.

In the south, the Gyele speak Kola, also known as Koya, in the south, also spelled as Likoya, Bako, Bakola, Bakuele, also Bekoe. The local derogatory term for pygmies, Babinga, is also used.

Glottolog adds Shiwa.

ALCAM (2012)

Non-Pygmy varieties
According to ALCAM (2012), the non-Pygmy Kwasio people speak two language varieties, Mvumbo and Mabi, which have moderate mutual intelligibility. They are spoken in Océan Department, Southern Region. The Bisio group of Kwasio people live in Equatorial Guinea, as well as in Gabon where they is known under the ethnonym Shiwo.

Kwasio is geographically the most western of the languages of the A80-A90 Bantu linguistic continuum. It is closely related to Mbwa (Békol) and Bajwe'e, and more distantly to Méka and Béti.

Mabi, the more western dialect, is spoken on the Atlantic coast around Kribi, among Batanga-speaking populations.

Mvumbo is spoken immediately to the east, along the road from Kribi to Lolodorf, in the communes of these two towns, where speakers are mixed mainly with Fang and Ewondo (Beti Fang)-speaking populations.

Pygmy varieties
According to ALCAM (2012), Gyáli and Kola are very close to each other and coexist in the same camps and settlements. On the other hand, they are not in contact with the Baka, the eastern Pygmies.

There are also close linguistic relationships between Bagyáli and the Meka group, although the non-Pygmy Mabi and Mvumbo peoples do not typically like to admit that their language, Kwasio, is closely related to the Pygmy language varieties.

The Bagyáli traditionally inhabit the forests of Océan Department (Southern Region), around Kribi, Bipindi and Lolodorf (in the communes of Kribi, Akom II, Bipindi, and Lolodorf), and are estimated at 4,250 people.

The Bagyáli are also found in Equatorial Guinea.

Features
Like the other Niger-Congo languages of Cameroon, Kwasio is a tonal language.

As a Bantu language, it has noun class system. The Kwasio noun class system is somewhat reduced, having retained only 6 genders (a gender being a pairing of a singular and a plural noun class).

See also
The term Bakola is also used for the pygmies of the northern Congo–Gabon border region, which speak the Ngom language.

References

Serge BAHUCHET, 2006. "Languages of the African Rainforest « Pygmy » Hunter-Gatherers: Language Shifts without Cultural Admixture." In Historical linguistics and hunter-gatherers populations in global perspective. Leipzig.

External links
Bakola documentation project, DoBeS
Gyɛlɛ (Bagielli) materials from Roger Blench

 
Makaa-Njem languages
Languages of Cameroon
Languages of Equatorial Guinea
African Pygmies

de:Gyele